(also known as Party Room 21) released Family Computer and Super Famicom video games during the 1990s. They also published a game for the Game Boy.

Most of the games produced were of the board game/trivia genres. Their most "notable" titles during their years of production were the Famicom game Battle Storm and the Super Famicom game Super Hockey '94.

During the 1994 fiscal year, the company published a range of software for the Family Computer before Yonezawa was bought by Sega. After the buyout, the company changed name to Sega Yonezawa, which it was known as until it was merged into Sega Toys in 1998.

Video games
 Battle Storm (1991)
 Gimme a Break: Shijou Saikyou no Quiz Ou Ketteisen (1991)
 Hiden Inyou Kikouhou: Ca Da (1991)
 Gimme a Break: Shijou Saikyou no Quiz Ou Ketteisen 2 (1992)
 Shijou Saikyou no Quiz Ou Ketteisen Super (1992)
 Casino Derby & Super Bingo (1993)
 The Gorilla Man (1993)
 Super Hockey '94 (1994)

References

Video game companies disestablished in 1998
Video game companies established in 1988
Defunct video game companies of Japan
Japanese companies disestablished in 1998
Japanese companies established in 1988